Pinnacles Provincial Park is a 124-hectare provincial park located just west of Quesnel in Cariboo Regional District, British Columbia, Canada. The park protects a collection of prominent hoodoos nestled in a small forested valley overlooking the city of Quesnel.

References

External links

Geography of the Cariboo
Provincial parks of British Columbia
1969 establishments in British Columbia
Protected areas established in 1969